Flower of Rajya is a firm yak's-milk cheese made in Nepal by Tibetan nomads in collaboration with the Trace Foundation. Milk is heated and ripened in big copper vats, curdled, drained and molded into  wheels. The cheese is dry-cured in Tibetan red salt, aged, then wrapped in scarves and packed in bamboo  baskets.

See also

 List of cheeses

References 
 "Yak Cheese." All Things Considered. National Public Radio. NPR. April 27, 2002.
 White, Johnathan. "Developing a Knack for Yak" Los Angeles Times 23, Jan. 2002

Yak's-milk cheeses
Tibetan cheeses
Nepalese cuisine